Mehdi Bouadla (born 2 February 1982) is a French-Algerian professional boxer. He has challenged once each for a middleweight world title and the European super-middleweight title.

Professional career
Bouadla made his professional debut on 15 October 2003, scoring a second-round corner retirement over Rachid Mokhtari. Fighting mainly in France for the next eight years, Bouadla won the France super-middleweight title and defended it twice, as well as winning various WBA, IBF and WBO regional titles. On 4 June 2011, he faced veteran former world champion Mikkel Kessler for the European super-middleweight title, but was stopped in six rounds.

The following year, on 15 December, Bouadla fought for his first world title against WBO super-middleweight champion Arthur Abraham, who won via eighth-round stoppage. 2013 and early 2014 saw Bouadla pick up four straight wins, each a six-round points decision. Another chance at a world championship—this time the WBA interim middleweight title—came on 9 August 2014, against undefeated prospect Dmitry Chudinov. Once again Bouadla was unsuccessful, as he was stopped in three rounds.

Professional boxing record

References

External links

French male boxers
Middleweight boxers
Super-middleweight boxers
1982 births
Living people
French sportspeople of Algerian descent